Rune Eriksen (born 13 January 1975) is a Norwegian Spellemann award-winning musician and composer. He is best known as the former guitarist in the black metal band Mayhem under the stage name Blasphemer, which he took from a Sodom song. He joined the band in October 1994, but departed in late 2008. He currently plays in Aura Noir, Earth Electric, and the multinational bands Twilight Of The Gods and Vltimas, the latter a supergroup of sorts with vocalist David Vincent (formerly of Morbid Angel), and drummer Flo Mounier of Cryptopsy. Ironically, Rune and Flo also played together with Steve Tucker (predecessor and successor of David Vincent in Morbid Angel) for the artist Nader Sadek and de Rune has also made guest appearances with Absu, Negură Bunget, and Root. His former bands and projects are, besides Nader Sadek, Mezzerschmitt, and the Portuguese gothic doom band Ava Inferi. He resides in Portugal.

Discography

With Mayhem
 Wolf's Lair Abyss (1997)
 Mediolanum Capta Est (1999)
 Grand Declaration of War (2000)
 Live in Marseilles (2002)
 Chimera (2004)
 Ordo Ad Chao (2007)
With Earth Electric
Vol. 1: Solar

With Twilight Of The Gods
Fire on the Mountain (2013)
With Mezzerschmitt
Weltherrschaft (2002)

With Ava Inferi
 Burdens (2006)
 The Silhouette (2007)
 Blood of Bacchus (2009)
 Onyx (2011)

With Aura Noir
Black Thrash Attack (1996)
The Merciless (2004)
Hades Rise (2008)
Out to Die (2012)

With Nader Sadek
In the Flesh (2011)
Living Flesh (2013)
The Malefic: Chapter III (2014)

With Vltimas
Something Wicked Marches In (2019)

References

1975 births
Living people
Mayhem (band) members
Norwegian rock guitarists
Norwegian musicians
Scandinavian musicians
Norwegian black metal musicians
Norwegian heavy metal guitarists
Norwegian multi-instrumentalists
Black metal guitarists
Aura Noir members
21st-century Norwegian guitarists
Place of birth missing (living people)